T. F. Riggs High School, also known simply as Riggs, is the only high school in Pierre, South Dakota. The school mascot is the Pierre Governors. The school has over 800 students and is one of the biggest in South Dakota.

It was named after South Dakota native Dr. Theodore F. Riggs (1874–1962), a Johns Hopkins graduate and local physician.

Demographics
The student body makeup of the school is 49% male and 51% female. The total minority enrollment is 19%. The student-teacher ratio is 18:1

Notable alumni
Paul Fuoss, physicist 
Dusty Johnson, member of the United States House of Representatives for South Dakota's at-large congressional district
Scott Rislov, retired Arena Football League quarterback

References

Public high schools in South Dakota
Buildings and structures in Pierre, South Dakota
Schools in Hughes County, South Dakota